Metynnis maculatus, the spotted metynnis, is a species of serrasalmid fish found in Argentina and Brazil, and possibly in Bolivia, Paraguay, and Peru.  It is one of the species of fish known in the aquarium trade as the "silver dollar".

References
 

Serrasalmidae
Fish of South America
Fish of Argentina
Fish of Brazil
Taxa named by Rudolf Kner 
Fish described in 1858